Good Clean Fun may refer to:

 Good Clean Fun (production company), an American television production company
 Good Clean Fun (band), a hardcore punk band from Washington, D.C. 
 "Good Clean Fun" (The Monkees song)
 "Good Clean Fun" (The Allman Brothers Band song)
 "Good Clean Fun", a song by Cat Power from the album What Would the Community Think
 "Good Clean Fun", a song by Descendents from the album I Don't Want to Grow Up
 Good Clean Fun, an album by Bonnie Hayes with the Wild Combo